Bill Rogers may refer to:

Sports
 Bill Rogers (quarterback), college football and basketball player for the South Carolina Gamecocks
 Bill Rogers (tackle) (1913–1977), American football player
 Bill Rogers (athlete) (born 1985), Liberian runner
 Bill Rogers (footballer) (1893–1918), Australian rules footballer
 Bill Rogers (golfer) (born 1951), American golfer

Others
 Bill Rogers (educationalist), Australian educationalist
 Bill Rogers (Michigan politician) (born 1954), member of the Michigan House of Representatives (2009–2012)
 Bill Rogers (New Zealand politician) (1887–1971), member of the New Zealand Legislative Council (1940–1950)
 Bill Rogers (voice actor), New York-based voice actor
 Bill Rogers (musician) (1906–1984), Guyanese musician, born Augustus Hinds

See also
 Billie Rogers (1917–2014), big band jazz trumpeter born Zelda Louise Smith
 William Rogers (disambiguation) 
 William Rodgers (disambiguation)